Fire of Love (French: Le feu de Dieu) is a 1967 French-Italian drama film directed by Georges Combret and starring Achille Zavatta, Dominique Boschero and Noëlle Noblecourt.

Cast
 Achille Zavatta as Pierre Michaux  
 Dominique Boschero as Monique  
 Noëlle Noblecourt as Colette  
 René Dary as Marois  
 Claudio Camaso as Jean-Louis  
 Jean Maley 
 Maurice Sarfati as Michel

References

Bibliography
 Philippe Rège. Encyclopedia of French Film Directors, Volume 1. Scarecrow Press, 2009.

External links

1967 films
1967 drama films
French drama films
Italian drama films
1960s French-language films
Films directed by Georges Combret
1960s French films
1960s Italian films